Patrick Carroll Bloom (March 11, 1928 – December 18, 1991) was a Canadian football player who played for the Saskatchewan Roughriders and Ottawa Rough Riders.

References

1928 births
Canadian football running backs
Ottawa Rough Riders players
Saskatchewan Roughriders players
Players of Canadian football from Ontario
Canadian football people from Ottawa
1991 deaths